Haploplatytes is a genus of moths of the family Crambidae. It contains only one species, Haploplatytes moluccellus, which is found on the Moluccas.

References

Crambinae
Crambidae genera
Monotypic moth genera
Taxa named by Stanisław Błeszyński